Enter the Dru is the second studio album from American R&B group Dru Hill, released October 27, 1998 on Island Records. The album's name comes from Bruce Lee's film, Enter the Dragon. This is the first album that the group were credited as executive producers as all four members wrote and produced several of the songs. It released three singles "How Deep Is Your Love", "These Are The Times" and "You Are Everything". The singles all had music videos released, but the music video for "You Are Everything" was a remix video, which featured rapper Ja Rule, and Woody did not appear in it due to his exit from the group in early 1999. The remix version was featured on lead singer Sisqó's debut album, Unleash the Dragon. Recording sessions for the album took place at Larabee Studios in Los Angeles, California. The album peaked at number two on the Billboard 200 chart. In May 1999, it was certified double-platinum in sales by the Recording Industry Association of America (RIAA), after sales exceeding 2,000,000 copies in the United States.

Overview
The songs on the album are mainly performed by lead singer, Sisqó, who performs solo on four songs: "Real Freak", "How Deep Is Your Love", "This Is What We Do" and "One Good Reason". Jazz performs solo on "Holding You" and "I'll Be the One". Woody performs solo on "Angel". Nokio does not perform solo on any songs but he does get more lead vocals than on the previous album.

Background
The album was recorded over a three-week span at Larabee Studios in Los Angeles, California during the early months of 1998. Group member James "Woody Rock" Green would leave the group soon after the release of the album to pursue a career as a gospel musician. The other members also went on to do solo albums, which forced the group to go on hiatus.

Release and reception

The album peaked at two on the U.S. Billboard 200 and on the R&B Albums chart. The album was certified gold in December 1998 and eventually double-platinum by May 1999. Michael Gallucci of Allmusic gave the group and their second effort a favorable review, stating that "Dru Hill slice into the section of '90s soul music that crosses bedroom come-ons with classic street savvy (and nervy beats) without sounding at all whipped."

Track listing

Charts

Weekly charts

Year-end charts

Certifications

Personnel
Information taken from Allmusic.
a&r – Matthew Schwartz
arranging – Nokio the N-Tity, Guy Roche
assistant engineering – Tom Bender, Greg Burns, Mick Guzauski, Kevin Lively, Ted Reiger, Aaron Sprague, The Storm, Dylan Vaughn, Pascal Volberg
assistant mixing – E'lyk, The Storm, Pascal Volberg
bass – Alex Al, Ronnie Garrett, Michael Thompson
clothing/wardrobe – Julieanne Mijares
conductor(s) – Larry Gold, Sisqó
drum programming – Babyface, Nokio the N-Tity, Greg Phillinganes, Guy Roche, Daryl Simmons, Ralph Stacy, Damon Thomas, William "P Sound" Thomas
engineering – Paul Boutin, Greg Burns, Felipe Elgueta, Thom "TK" Kidd, Mario Lucy, Manny Marroquin, Jason Rome, Rafa Sardina, Jon Smeltz, Ralph Stacy, Moana Suchard, Joe Warlick
executive production – Dru Hill, Hiriam Hicks, Haqq Islam, Kevin Peck, Kenneth Crear
grooming – Heba Thorisdottir
guitar – James Harrah, Sonny Lallerstedt, Michael Hart Thompson
keyboards – Babyface, David Foster, Nokio the N-Tity, Greg Phillinganes, Guy Roche, Daryl Simmons, Ralph Stacy, Damon Thomas, Phil Weatherspoon
mastering – Chris Gehringer
mixing – Bonzai, Jon Gass, Mick Guzauski, Thom "TK" Kidd, Manny Marroquin, Thom Russo, Jon Smeltz
performer(s) – Chinky Brown Eyes, Method Man
photo assistance – Beth Coller, John Garcia
photography – Beth Coller, John Garcia, Tracy Lamonica
piano – Alex Al, Warryn Campbell, Greg Phillinganes
production – Baby Dave, Babyface, Warryn Campbell, Dutch, David Foster, James "Woody" Green, Nokio the N-Tity, Guy Roche, Daryl Simmons, Sisqó, Ralph Stacy, Damon Thomas
production coordination – Ivy Skoff
rapping – Method Man
strings – Cameron Stone
string arranging – Larry Gold, Sisqó
string conduction – Larry Gold
stylistic advisor – Laurie Chang, April Roomet
stylistic assistant – Laurie Chang, April Roomet
synclavier – Simon Franglen
synclavier programming – Simon Franglen
vocal arranging – R. Brown, Nokio the N-Tity, Guy Roche, Sisqó
vocal production – Nokio the N-Tity
vocals – Dru Hill, Nokio the N-Tity, Sisqó
vocals (background) – Dru Hill

Notes

External links
 
 Enter the Dru at Discogs

1998 albums
Dru Hill albums
Island Records albums
Albums produced by Warryn Campbell